TuS Altrip is a German football club from the municipality of Altrip, Rhineland-Palatinate.

History
The club was established 13 August 1906 as the gymnastics club Turnverein Altrip and in 1911 it opened a football department. TV adopted the name Turn- und Sportverein Altrip in 1920. Four years later the football department became independent as Sportverein Altrip. Sometime around 1933 the footballers were reunited with their parent club.

TuS won promotion to the Amateurliga Südwest (III) in 1961 and were sent down in 1964. They made a single season appearance there in 1965–66 but fared poorly. They returned to Amateurliga play for a three-season turn from 1971–74. After two consecutive 6th-place finishes they crashed to 16th in 1974 and were relegated.

Most recently the footballers played in the Bezirksliga Vorderpfalz, followed by the A- and B-Klassen Mittelhardt and are part of a larger sports club that includes departments for athletics, badminton, and gymnastics.

References

External links
Official team site
Das deutsche Fußball-Archiv historical German domestic league tables 

 
Football clubs in Germany
Football clubs in Rhineland-Palatinate
Association football clubs established in 1911
Sports clubs established in 1906
1906 establishments in Germany